C.D. Reiss is an American novelist best known for contemporary and erotic romance. Reiss is a New York Times and USA Today bestselling novelist. In 2016 Reiss was nominated for two  Audie Awards in one category for the audio books, Beg Tease Submit and Control Burn Resist. She is the recipient of the Audie Award for the audio book, Marriage Games published in 2017.

Bibliography

Standalone novels

 2015:- Shuttergirl
 2016:- HardBall
 2017:- Hollywood A-List
 2019:- Only Ever You
 2020:- The Crowne Brothers
 2020:- Lead Me Back

Series
 2013:- The Submission Series
 2014:- Corruption Series
 2014:- Forbidden Series
 2016:- The Games Duet
 2018:- The Edge Series
 2021:- DiLustro Arrangement Series

Erotica
 2019:- Best Women's Erotica of the Year

References

External links
 Official website
 Facebook

American erotica writers
American women novelists
21st-century American novelists
Living people
21st-century American women writers
Year of birth missing (living people)
Place of birth missing (living people)
Women erotica writers